Reynolds Bench is a nearly flat bench, or mesa-like feature, 6 nautical miles (11 km) long and 2 nautical miles (3.7 km) wide, that has a smooth, snow-covered surface but has rock outcroppings along its steep sides. The feature stands at the north side of the Kelley Massif, to which it appears to be joined, along the south side of the upper Clifford Glacier in Palmer Land. Mapped by United States Geological Survey (USGS) in 1974. Named by Advisory Committee on Antarctic Names (US-ACAN) for Richard L. Reynolds, geologist with the USGS Lassiter Coast geologic and mapping party in 1970–71.
 

Mesas of Antarctica
Landforms of Palmer Land